Ian Levy (born 14 February 1966) is a British Conservative Party politician who was elected as Member of Parliament (MP) for Blyth Valley at the 2019 general election. He is the first Conservative to represent Blyth Valley since the constituency was created in 1950.

Early life and career
Levy left school at the age of 16 to become a grave digger. Prior to his election, Levy had worked as a healthcare assistant on an inpatient mental health rehabilitation ward in St Nicholas Hospital, Newcastle upon Tyne.

Parliamentary career 
He first contested the Blyth Valley constituency at the 2017 general election, in which incumbent Labour MP Ronnie Campbell held his seat with a majority of 7,915. Levy was subsequently elected for the constituency at the 2019 general election with a majority of 712 votes. He was the first Conservative to represent the constituency since its creation in 1950. It had previously been a safe Labour seat. He had campaigned on returning passenger railway services to the area and for a relief road in Blyth, which is supported by Transport for the North and other major highways improvements. Blyth's railway station had closed in 1964 as part of the Beeching cuts. After his election, he was accused of misleading the public, when the Nursing Times reported his social media posts from the campaign, in which he said he had worked as a mental health nurse. The posts were later amended. Cumbria, Northumberland, Tyne and Wear NHS Foundation Trust confirmed he had worked as a healthcare assistant. The term "nurse" is not legally protected so his posts had not violated the Nurses Registration Act 1919.

Levy won the Newcomer of the Year award at The Spectator Parliamentarian of the Year Awards.

In October 2020, Levy voted against a Labour motion to extend free school meals for eligible children until Easter 2021. He was criticised for this on social media. Levy also alleged that this included threats.

He was appointed as a Parliamentary Private Secretary in the Cabinet Office in April 2022. Levy supported Boris Johnson's bid to return as PM in the October 2022 Conservative Party leadership election. Recent reports is he will contest the new Cramlington seat at the next General election

Personal life 
Levy is of Jewish descent. He is married and has two children.

References

External links

1966 births
Living people
UK MPs 2019–present
Conservative Party (UK) MPs for English constituencies
Jewish British politicians